The wildlife of Iran include the fauna and flora of Iran.

One of the most famous wildlife of Iran is the critically endangered Asiatic cheetah (Acinonyx jubatus venaticus), which today survives only in Iran.

History
The wildlife of Iran first been partly described by Hamdallah Mustawfi in the 14th century who only referred to animals. In the 18th and 19th centuries, Samuel Gottlieb Gmelin and Édouard Ménétries explored the Caspian Sea area and the Talysh Mountains to document Caspian fauna. Several naturalists followed in the 19th century, including Filippo de Filippi, William Thomas Blanford, and Nikolai Zarudny who documented mammal, bird, reptile, amphibian and fish species.

Flora

More than one-tenth of the country is forested. The most extensive growths are found on the mountain slopes rising from the Caspian Sea, with stands of oak, ash, elm, cypress, and other valuable trees. On the plateau proper, areas of scrub oak appear on the best-watered mountain slopes, and villagers cultivate orchards and grow the plane tree, poplar, willow, walnut, beech, maple, and mulberry. Wild plants and shrubs spring from the barren land in the spring and afford pasturage, but the summer sun burns them away. According to FAO reports, the major types of forests that exist in Iran and their respective areas are:
 Caspian forests of the northern districts (33,000 km2)
 Limestone mountainous forests in the northeastern districts (Juniperus forests, 13,000 km2)
 Pistachio forests in the eastern, southern and southeastern districts (26,000 km2)
 Oak forests in the central and western districts (100,000 km2)
 Shrubs of the Dasht-e Kavir districts in the central and northeastern part of the country (10,000 km2)
 Sub-tropical forests of the southern coast (5,000 km2) like the Hara forests.
More than 8,200 plant species are grown in Iran. The land covered by Iran's natural flora is four times that of the Europe's.

Fauna

Iran's living fauna includes 34 bat species, Indian grey mongoose, small Indian mongoose, golden jackal, Indian wolf, foxes, striped hyena, leopard, Eurasian lynx, brown bear and Asian black bear. Ungulate species include wild boar, urial, Armenian mouflon, red deer, and goitered gazelle.
Domestic ungulates are represented by sheep, goat, cattle, horse, water buffalo, donkey and camel. Bird species like pheasant, partridge, stork, eagles and falcons are also native to Iran.

Endangered

As of 2001, 20 of Iran's mammal species and 14 bird species are endangered. Endangered species in Iran include the Baluchistan bear, Asiatic cheetah, Caspian seal, Persian fallow deer, Siberian crane, hawksbill turtle, green turtle, Oxus cobra, Latifi's viper, dugong, Panthera pardus tulliana, Caspian Sea wolf, and dolphin. At least 74 species of Iranian wildlife are listed on the IUCN Red List, a sign of serious threats to the country’s biodiversity. Majlis has been showing disregard for wildlife by passing laws and regulations such as the act that lets the Ministry of Industries and Mines (Iran) exploit mines without the involvement of the Department of Environment (Iran), and by approving large national development projects without demanding comprehensive study of their impact on wildlife habitats.
The leopard's main range overlaps with that of bezoar ibex, which occurs throughout Alborz and Zagros mountain ranges, as well as smaller ranges within the Iranian Plateau. The leopard population is very sparse, due to loss of habitat, loss of natural prey, and population fragmentation. Apart from bezoar ibex, wild sheep, boar, deer, and domestic livestock constitute leopard prey in Iran.

Extinct
 Aurochs (unknown date).
 The Syrian elephant roamed southern Iran, before vanishing there in ancient times.
The Asiatic lion was recorded only in Iran's Khuzestan and Fars Provinces. The last sighting occurred in 1957 in the Dez River valley. In the 1970s, Arzhan National Park was considered as a site for its reintroduction.
 The Caspian tiger used to occur in the northern region around the Caspian Sea, and in the Trans-Caucasian and Turkestani regions of the Union of Soviet Socialist Republics, before 1960. The last tiger in Iran was reportedly sighted in Golestan National Park in 1958.

See also
List of birds of Iran
List of mammals of Iran
List of non-marine molluscs of Iran
List of biosphere reserves in Iran
List of national parks and protected areas of Iran
Geography of Iran
Environmental issues in Iran
International rankings of Iran
Wildlife of Afghanistan
Wildlife of Indian Subcontinent
Wildlife of Iraq

References

External links
 Fauna of Persia, Encyclopædia Iranica
 Department of Environment of Iran
 Conservation of Asiatic Cheetah Project (CACP), Government of Iran
 Asian Leopard Specialist Society, Iran: Research, Conservation and Management
 Iranian Wildlife Reference Resource
 Flora of Iran by Pr Ahmad GHAHREMAN
 Flora of Iran
 "Iranian Cheetah Society (ICS)"
 Iran-zoo, a private website
 Status of the Persian Leopard in Iran
 Skin of a Persian lioness, belonging to an endangered subspecies of lions, brought to Dublin by King Edward VII in 1902.
Videos
 Wild Iran - Documentary (2014)

Iran
Biota of Iran